Hillar is an Estonian masculine given name and may refer to:
Hillar Aarelaid (born 1967), Estonian security officer
Hillar Eller (1939–2010), Estonian politician
Hillar Hein (born 1954), Estonian ski jumper, Nordic combined skier and coach
Hillar Kalda (born 1932), Estonian physician and politician
Hillar Kareva (1931–1992), Estonian composer
Hillar Kärner (born 1935), Estonian chess player
Hillar Mets (born 1954), Estonian cartoonist, illustrator and animator
Hillar Palamets (1927–2022), Estonian historian and radio presenter
Hillar Rootare (1928–2008), Estonian-American physical chemist and materials scientist
Hillar Teder (born 1962), Estonian businessman

As a surname
Helena Hillar Rosenqvist (born 1946), a Swedish  politician. 
Marian Hillar (born 1938), an American philosopher, theologian, linguist, and scientist.

References

Estonian masculine given names
Surnames